Auberge (a French word meaning "inn") is the eleventh studio album by British singer-songwriter Chris Rea, released in 1991. The album, as well as the title song, is notable for its association with the Caterham Super Seven that Rea owned, which he called the "Blue Seven". The car appears on the album cover, illustrated in oil by renowned motoring artist Alan Fearnley. The album makes several references to the car over several tracks, as well on the video of the title song, and its cover illustration was used for its adverts. In 2005, Rea sold the car in an auction.

Singles
The title track gave Rea one of his biggest hits in the UK Singles Chart, where it reached number 16. Other tracks released as singles were "Heaven", "Looking for the Summer" and "Winter Song". The track "And You My Love", though not released as a single, has become a firm favourite among Rea's fans and is regularly performed at his live concerts.

Commercial performance
Auberge reached number one in the UK Albums Chart and number one in the German Albums Chart in 1991. Q Magazine described the album as 'more of the same, with a few subtle differences to keep both doubters and aficionados guessing'.

Track listing 
All tracks written by Chris Rea.
 "Auberge" – 7:18
 "Gone Fishing" – 4:41
 "You're Not a Number" – 5:00
 "Heaven" – 4:13
 "Set Me Free" – 6:53
 "Winter Song" – 4:35
 "Red Shoes" – 3:54
 "Sing a Song of Love to Me" – 3:34
 "Every Second Counts" – 5:08
 "Looking for the Summer" – 5:03
 "And You My Love" – 5:28
 "The Mention of Your Name" – 3:17

"Winter Song" did not appear on the initial album release; released as a stand-alone single in November 1991, it was included on some subsequent CD issues.

Personnel 

 Chris Rea – lead vocals, Hammond organ, harmonica, slide guitar, classical guitar, lead guitar (1-9)
 Max Middleton – grand piano (1, 2, 3, 5, 7, 8, 9), keyboards (6), Rhodes (10, 11, 12), string arrangements
 Anthony Drennan – nylon guitar (2, 5, 9, 10), dobro (2, 4), acoustic guitar (4, 8, 10), jazz guitar (7), guitars (11)
 Robert Ahwai – bass (1-11)
 Martin Ditcham – drums (1-11), percussion (1-11)
 The Kick Horns – horn arrangements
 Simon Clarke – alto saxophone, baritone saxophone
 Tim Sanders – tenor saxophone
 Kenny Hamilton – bass trombone 
 J. Neil Sidwell – trombone
 Rick Taylor – trombone
 Roddy Lorimer – trumpet, flugelhorn
 Paul Spong – trumpet, flugelhorn
 Nick Hitchens – tuba
 Gavyn Wright – orchestra leader
 Carol Kenyon – backing vocals
 Linda Taylor – backing vocals

Production 
 Jon Kelly – producer
 John Mackswith – engineer
 Justin Shirley-Smith – engineer
 Russell Shaw – engineer
 Willie Grimston – production coordination
 Alan Fearnley – paintings

Charts

Certifications

References 

Chris Rea albums
1991 albums
Albums produced by Jon Kelly
Atco Records albums